An Abbreviated New Drug Application (ANDA) is an application for a U.S. generic drug approval for an existing licensed medication or approved drug.

The ANDA is submitted to FDA's Center for Drug Evaluation and Research, Office of Generic Drugs, which provides for the review and ultimate approval of a generic drug product. Once approved, an applicant may manufacture and market the generic drug product to provide a safe, effective, low cost alternative to the American public. Electronic submissions of ANDAs have grown by 70% since November 2008. The Section IV challenge has been credited with suppressing new drug innovation.

A generic drug product is one that is comparable to a patented drug product in dosage form, strength, route of administration, quality, performance characteristics and intended use.  All approved products, both innovator and generic, are listed in FDA's Approved Drug Products with Therapeutic Equivalence Evaluations (Orange Book).

Generic drug applications are termed "abbreviated" because (in comparison with a New Drug Application) they are generally not required to include preclinical (animal and in vitro) and clinical (human) trial data to establish safety and effectiveness.  Instead, generic applicants must scientifically demonstrate that their product is bioequivalent (i.e., performs in the same manner as the innovator drug).  One way scientists demonstrate bioequivalence is to measure the time it takes the generic drug to reach the bloodstream in 24 to 36 healthy volunteers.  This gives them the rate of absorption, or bioavailability, of the generic drug, which they can then compare to that of the innovator drug.  The generic version must deliver the same amount of active ingredients into a patient's bloodstream in the same amount of time as the innovator drug. In cases of topically active drugs, the bioequivalence of a drug can be demonstrated by comparing drugs dissolution or transdermal drug absorption is compared with the innovator drug.  In cases of systemically active drugs, active drug blood concentration of that drug is compared with the innovator drug.

Using bioequivalence as the basis for approving generic copies of drug products was established by the Drug Price Competition and Patent Term Restoration Act of 1984, also known as the Hatch-Waxman Act. This Act expedites the availability of less costly generic drugs by permitting FDA to approve applications to market generic versions of brand-name drugs without conducting costly and duplicative clinical trials.  At the same time, the brand-name companies can apply for up to five additional years longer patent protection for the new medicines they developed to make up for time lost while their products were going through FDA's approval process. Brand-name drugs are subject to the same bioequivalence tests as generics upon reformulation.

Notes

External links
 FDA source
  

ANDA
Pharmaceutical regulation in the United States